The 1890 Cincinnati Reds season was a season in American baseball. The team finished fourth in the National League with a record of 77–55, 10½ behind the Brooklyn Bridegrooms. Directly after the season ended, owner Aaron Stern sold the club to Al Johnson.

Regular season 
After playing eight seasons in the American Association, the Cincinnati Red Stockings jumped to the National League for the 1890 season, and renamed themselves the Cincinnati Reds. The Reds hired Tom Loftus as their new manager. He last managed the Cleveland Spiders in 1889, leading them to a 61–72 record and a sixth-place finish in the National League.

In the off-season, the Reds acquired Lefty Marr from the Columbus Solons for $2000. Marr had hit .306 with a league high 15 triples for the Solons in 1889. He had also appeared in eight games with the Red Stockings in 1886. The team also purchased the contract of pitcher Frank Foreman from the Baltimore Orioles. Foreman was 23–21 with a 3.52 with the Orioles. Cincinnati also signed two 21-year-olds, catcher Jerry Harrington and pitcher Billy Rhines. Joe Knight, who last appeared in the majors with the Philadelphia Quakers in 1884 as a pitcher, was signed to play the outfield.

John Reilly led the club offensively, hitting .300 with team highs with six home runs and 86 RBI. Bid McPhee had a .256 average with three homers and 39 RBI, as well as team highs with 125 runs and 55 stolen bases. Knight led the club with a .312 average with four homers and 67 RBI in his only season in the majors. Rhines led the pitching staff, as he had a 28–17 record with league best 1.95 ERA.

Season summary 
The Reds played their first National League game on April 19, 1890. Despite a home run from Bug Holliday, Cincinnati lost to the Chicago Colts by a 5–4 score. After hovering around the .500 level, as the Reds had a record of 11–11 after twenty-two games, the team went on a 22–2 run to boost their record to 33–13, and take a four-game lead over the second place Brooklyn Bridegrooms. Cincinnati would hold on to their first place lead until going into a slump in which the Reds lost ten of eleven games to fall into fourth place, 5.5 games out of first. By the time the season ended, the Reds had a 77–55 record, finishing in fourth place, 10½ games behind the Bridegrooms.

Season standings

Record vs. opponents

Roster

Player stats

Batting

Starters by position 
Note: Pos = Position; G = Games played; AB = At bats; H = Hits; Avg. = Batting average; HR = Home runs; RBI = Runs batted in

Other batters 
Note: G = Games played; AB = At bats; H = Hits; Avg. = Batting average; HR = Home runs; RBI = Runs batted in

Pitching

Starting pitchers 
Note: G = Games pitched; IP = Innings pitched; W = Wins; L = Losses; ERA = Earned run average; SO = Strikeouts

References

External links
1890 Cincinnati Reds season at Baseball Reference

Cincinnati Reds seasons
Cincinnati Reds season
Cincinnati Reds